The 2014–15 Campeonato Nacional de Seniores was the second season of the third-tier football league in Portugal. It began on August 24, 2014 and finished on June 14, 2015.

Overview

The league was divided in eight series of 10 clubs placed geographically, with the exception of teams from Madeira Islands (divided through the first series) and from the Azores Islands (divided through the last series).

After a First Stage in a home-and-away system, the first two best placed teams of each league played in two groups of 8 teams in a Second Stage with each league winner earning a promotion to the LigaPro, plus a two-round play-off winner between the two second placed teams. The two group winners then played a Grand Final on neutral ground for the overall Campeonato Nacional title.

The remaining 8 clubs from each league from the First Stage played in 8 different groups with the last two placed teams being relegated to the Districts Championships. The 6th placed teams from those leagues then played a two-round play-off with between themselves to decide the remaining four clubs to be relegated.

Teams
Qualified teams:

No team was relegated from Segunda Liga in this season (due to the Segunda Liga increasing number of teams).

From 2013–14 CNS:

 Fafe
 Bragança
 Mirandela
 Santa Maria
 Vianense
 Vilaverdense
 Limianos
 Pedras Salgadas
 Varzim
 Tirsense
 Famalicão
 Vizela
 Oliveirense
 Ribeirão
 Amarante
 Felgueiras 1932
 Sp. Espinho
 Cinfães
 Gondomar
 Lusitânia Lourosa
 Coimbrões
 Sousense
 Salgueiros 08
 Anadia
 Cesarense
 Estarreja
 S. J. Vêr
 Camacha
 Lusitano FCV
 Naval
 Benf. Castelo Branco
 Pampilhosa
 Sourense
 Tourizense
 Nogueirense
 U. Leiria
 Torreense
 Caldas
 Fátima
 At. Riachense
 Sertanense
 Mafra
 Alcanenense
 Casa Pia
 1.º Dezembro
 Loures
 Pinhalnovense
 Sintrense
 U. Montemor
 Cova da Piedade
 Louletano
 Moura
 Quarteirense
 Operário (Açores)
 Praiense
 Ferreiras

Promoted from the District Championships:

 Algarve FA: Lusitano VRSA
 Aveiro FA: Sanjoanense and Gafanha
 Beja FA: Aljustrelense
 Braga FA: Vieira S.C. and CCD Santa Eulália
 Bragança FA: no representation
 Castelo Branco FA: Vit. Sernache
 Coimbra FA: Oliv. Hospital
 Évora FA: Atl. Reguengos
 Guarda FA: CD Gouveia
 Leiria FA: Sp. Pombal
 Lisboa FA: At. Malveira and Sacavenense
 Madeira FA: Marítimo C
 Portalegre FA: Eléctrico
 Porto FA: FC Pedras Rubras and Sobrado
 Santarém FA: Atl. Ouriense
 Setúbal FA: Fabril Barreiro
 Viana do Castelo FA: Cerveira
 Vila Real FA: Vila Real
 Viseu FA: Moimenta da Beira e Mortágua
 Azores League: Angrense

First stage

Serie A

Serie B

Serie C

Serie D

Serie E

Serie F

Serie G

Serie H

Second stage

Promotion groups

North Zone

South Zone

Third place playoff

First leg

Second leg

Varzim won 3-1 on aggregate and were promoted to LigaPro.

Grand final

Relegations Group

Serie A

Serie B

Serie C

Serie D

Serie E

Serie F

Serie G

Serie H

6th places playouts

See also
 2014–15 Primeira Liga
 2014–15 Segunda Liga
 2014–15 Taça de Portugal
 2014–15 Taça da Liga

Notes

References

Campeonato Nacional de Seniores seasons
3
Por